Derya Arhan (born January 25, 1999) is a Turkish footballer, who plays as a defender for he Turkish Women's Football Super League club Galatasaray. She is a member of the Turkey women's national team. She was part of the Turkey national women's U-15, women's U-17 and women's U-19 teams.

Club career 

Derya Arhan obtained her license for the Küçükyalı, Istanbul-based club Sosyal Hizmetler Gençlik ve Spor on May 25, 2011.

Kdz. Ereğlispor 
Effective November 22, 2012, she transferred to Kdz Ereğlispor, and played in their newly established youth team for girls. She enjoyed Turkish Girls' Football Championship with her team in September 2013. Beginning with the 2013–14 season, she started playing in the women's team of her club as defender in the Turkish Women's First League.

Beşiktaş J.K. 
In the 2018–19 league season, she transferred to Beşiktaş J.K. She enjoyed the champion title of her team in the 2018–19 season.[1]

By July 2019, Arhan was transferred by the Spanish club Santa Teresa CD in Badajoz to play in the Primera División B.

ALG Spor 
By October 2019, she returned home and signed with the Gaziantep-based club ALG Spor. She debuted at the UEFA Women's Champions League playing in the |2020–21 UEFA Women's Champions League qualifying round against the Albanian team KFF Vllaznia Shkodër in Shkodër, Albania on 3 November 2020, and scored one goal.

WFC Zhytlobud-2 Kharkiv 
On 22 March 2021, she moved to Ukraine and joined WFC Zhytlobud-2 Kharkiv to play in the Ukrainian Women's League.

ALG Spor 
After returning home, she rejoined her club ALG Spor. She appeared for ALG Spor only in the first match of the 2021-22 Women's Super League season.

Fatih Karagümrük 
In the 2021–22 Women's Super League season, she moved to the nrely established Fatih Karagümrük.

Galatasaray S.K. 
On 9 August 2022, the Turkish Women's Football Super League team was transferred to the Galatasaray club.

International career

Turkey girls' U-17 
She was admitted to the Turkey women's national U-15 team, and debuted in the friendly match against Azerbaijan on October 2, 2013. She capped twice and scored one goal for the Turkey U-15 team.

Arhan played first time for the Turkey women's national U-17 team in the friendly game against the team from Greece on March 2, 2104. She later took part in the 2014 UEFA Development Tournament and 2015 UEFA Women's Under-17 Championship qualification – Group 8 matches.

Turkey women's U-19 
Between 2015 and 2018, Arhan played for the women's national U-19 team. She was part of the team, which became champion of the 2016 UEFA Development Tournament. She played in two matches of the 2017 UEFA Women's Under-19 Championship qualification – Group 10 and in every three games of the 2017 UEFA Women's Under-19 Championship qualification – Elite round Group 2 as well as 2018 UEFA Women's Under-19 Championship qualification – Group 10. She scored two goals in 24 matches for the national U-19 team.

Turkey women's 
On November 8, 2018, Arhan debuted in the Turkey women's national football team playing in the friendly match against Georgia.

Career statistics 
.

Honours

Club 
Turkish Women's First Football League
Beşiktaş J.K.
 Winners (1): 2018–19

ALG Spor
 Winners (1): 2019–20
 Third places (1): 2020–21

 Fatih Karagümrük
 Runners-up (1): 2021-22

International 
UEFA Development Tournament
 Turkey women's U-19
 Winners (1): 2016

References

External links

1999 births
Living people
Women's association football defenders
Women's association football midfielders
Turkish women's footballers
Footballers from Istanbul
People from Bayrampaşa
Turkey women's international footballers
Karadeniz Ereğlispor players
Beşiktaş J.K. women's football players
Segunda Federación (women) players
Santa Teresa CD players
Turkish expatriate women's footballers
Turkish expatriate sportspeople in Spain
Expatriate women's footballers in Spain
ALG Spor players
Turkish expatriate sportspeople in Ukraine
Expatriate women's footballers in Ukraine
WFC Zhytlobud-2 Kharkiv players
Fatih Karagümrük S.K. (women's football) players
Turkish Women's Football Super League players
Galatasaray S.K. women's football players